Chicopee High School (CHS) is a public high school located in Chicopee, Massachusetts, United States.  It serves students in grades 9 through 12.  Its official school colors are maroon and gold.  Its mascot is the "Pacer."

History

CHS was the third high school in Chicopee. Until 1896, two smaller high schools served Chicopee and Chicopee Falls. These were replaced by Central High School which opened in 1890 and served as the only high school until it was destroyed by fire in January 1916. The Taylor School in Chicopee Falls served as a temporary high school until 1921.

To be located at 650 Front Street, construction on a new Chicopee High School began in 1917 on land once occupied by the Assumption Church which itself had been destroyed by fire in 1912. Construction on the $1 million school was delayed by World War I, and CHS finally opened in September 1921. It was built in the collegiate style and faced with tapestry brick. Situated on a hill, its large front lawn featured the "keys of knowledge" outlined in shrubs. A small park and a memorial to Chicopee residents who died in World War I was constructed on an adjacent parcel.

CHS featured an auditorium that seated 1000 people and the first gymnasium in any Chicopee school. The Chicopee Trade School occupied a wing of the new CHS. In 1957 a new gymnasium complex was added, featuring a basketball court and pool. The gym was later named after a former principal Henry B. Fay. The old gymnasium was converted into a cafeteria, the balcony of which was nicknamed "Baby Heaven" and was used for suspended students. Another location that earned an enduring nickname was "Cats Alley," a windowless hallway on the second floor that ran between the gymnasium and the auditorium.

Notable alumni
 Ken Maiuri, composer and keyboardist for the B-52s
 Sabina Gadecki, actress and model, known for roles in Entourage and Narcos
 Phyllis St. Pierre, actress known for Son of Sinbad and The French Line

References

Buildings and structures in Chicopee, Massachusetts
Educational institutions in the United States with year of establishment missing
Public high schools in Massachusetts
Schools in Chicopee, Massachusetts
1921 establishments in Massachusetts